Ursula King (born 22 September 1938) is a German theologian and scholar of religion, who specialises in gender and religion, feminist theology, and Pierre Teilhard de Chardin.

Academic career
King was Professor of Theology and Religious Studies at the University of Bristol from 1989 to 2002, and then President of Catherine of Siena College, University of Roehampton from 2008 to 2015. She had previously been a lecturer at the Coloma College of Education (a teacher training college) and at the University of Leeds. She has held multiple visiting appointments: visiting lecturer at the University of Delhi, Indian Institute of Technology, and the Indian Social Institute; bye-fellow of Newnham College, Cambridge and Gonville and Caius College, Cambridge; and visiting professor at the University of Oslo, Xavier University and the University of Louisville.

Personal life
In 1958 Ursula Brenke passed her Abitur (A-levels) at the Irmgardis-Gymnasium Cologne and in 1963 she married Anthony Douglas King. Together they have four daughters.

King is a Roman Catholic. She signed the Catholic Scholars' Declaration on Authority in the Church, stating "Catholic women need to be able to hold positions within the church authority".

Selected works

References

1938 births
Living people
20th-century German theologians
21st-century German theologians
Christian feminist theologians
Women theologians
Academics of the University of Leeds
Academics of the University of Bristol
German Roman Catholic theologians